Andrés Hammersley Núñez (17 October 1919 — 10 January 2002) was a Chilean tennis player. He is considered one of the main referents of the tennis of his country in the 1940s and 1950s. Hammersley was nicknamed «the Huaso».

Biography 
He was son of the athlete Rodolfo Hammersley and Lucía Núñez, and brother of the skier Arturo Hammersley. Simultaneously to his tennis career, he studied contactology in Germany, being one of the first Chilean specialists in this area.

He had three marriages, one of them with Carla Timmerman. He spoke Spanish, English, French and German.

Sport career 
In 1941 he won his first Tennis Chilean championship, which repeated consecutively until 1946. Also he was runner-up in the Argentinian championship in 1945, and won the South American championship in 1943 and 1946.

He was the first Chilean to participate in the international tournament of Forest Hills —current US Open— in 1945,  and the following year he was invited to the Wimbledon Championship, where after being defeated by Dinny Pails, he suffered a mental confusion that dropped him out of tracks until 1948. He returned to Wimbledon in 1954, participating in all the versions of the tournament until 1958.

He was part of the Chilean team of Davis Cup between 1954 and 1957, being nominated in eight opportunities, and he played in the semifinal of the 1955 European zone against Sweden. He won 10 Davis Cup matches and lost 13.

Grand Slam performance timeline

References

1919 births
2002 deaths
Chilean male tennis players
Tennis players at the 1955 Pan American Games
Pan American Games competitors for Chile
Chilean people of English descent
20th-century Chilean people
21st-century Chilean people